Nigel Dupree Band is an American southern rock band from Kennesaw, Georgia, started by Nigel Thomas Dupree, the son of Jackyl lead vocalist Jesse James Dupree.  Having performed at events such as Full Throttle Saloon, Rocklahoma and Taste of Madison, the band has released two studio albums, Attraction and Up to No Good.

Discography

Studio albums 
 Attraction (2009)
 Up to No Good (2012)

Videos 
 "Tumbleweed" (2012)

Band members

Current members 
 Nigel Thomas Dupree – guitar, lead vocals

Former members 
 David Buchanan- guitar
 Alex Foretich – bass
 Adam Townshend – drums
 Josh Hilton – bass
 Garrett Whitlock – drums
 Sebastian Anderson – drums
 Kyle Cimino – guitar
 Zak Herman – guitar
 Danny Lee – bass
 Brandon Faulkner – drums

References

External links 
 

Musical groups from Atlanta
American southern rock musical groups
Rock music groups from Georgia (U.S. state)